Gibberula rowlingae is a species of sea snail, a marine gastropod mollusk, in the family Cystiscidae.

Description
The length of the shell attains 2.8 mm.

Distribution
This marine species occurs off the following locations:
 Guadeloupe
 Martinique

References

rowlingae
Gastropods described in 2015